Bandiagara is a small town and urban commune in the Mopti Region of Mali.  The name translates roughly to "large eating bowl"—referring to the communal bowl meals are served in. Mainly on its Bandiagara Escarpment it has about 2,000 speakers of the vibrant Bangime language, an isolate used mainly as an anti-language; it has the highest point of the country.

Bandiagara is 65 km east-southeast of Mopti. A seasonal river, the Yamé, flows in a northeasterly direction through the town. The population includes a number of different ethnic groups including Dogons, Fulani and Bambaras.

History
Bandiagara is said to have been founded in 1770 by Nangabanu Tembély, a Dogon hunter.

In 1864, Tidiani Tall, El Hadj Umar Tall's nephew and successor, chose Bandiagara as capital of the Toucouleur empire.

It is the birthplace of Malian authors Amadou Hampâté Bâ, Madina Ly-Tall and Yambo Ouologuem.

In the music video for the song Reset by Three Trapped Tigers it is shown as the location of an alien rune.

As of 2018 the town remained insecure with attacks on hotels used by UN staff being reported. Nine soldiers were killed and nine wounded in an attack on a police station on February 25, 2021.

See also
Bandiagara Escarpment
Ounjougou
Union of the Populations of Bandiagara

References

This article was originally based on the corresponding article in the French Wikipedia, accessed April 9, 2005. Additional reference was made to this article on Dec. 14, 2006.
B.O. Oloruntimeehin. The Segu Tukulor Empire. Humanities Press, New York (1972). SBN 391002066
UNESCO site about the Cliff of Bandiagara
Dogon Country

Toucouleur Empire
Communes of Mopti Region